Sally Gerber (born 1927 in Fremont, Michigan) is the daughter of Daniel Frank Gerber who established the baby food enterprise Gerber Products Company.

Sally Gerber was ill as a baby, and when she was seven months old, her pediatrician recommended a diet of fruits and vegetables which her mother prepared for her daily. Her mother Dorothy soon grew tired of hand-straining fruits and vegetables every day. She turned to her husband "Dan", owner of the Fremont Canning Company along with his father Frank Daniel Gerber, for help. The Gerbers saw a potential business opportunity in canning baby food at a cheaper price than the alternative - expensive prescription baby food. They began devoting resources of Fremont Canning Company to baby food production. By 1928 the canning company was making five products: strained peas, prunes, carrots and spinach, and beef vegetable soup. Sally Gerber began answering many letters from customers when she was barely 10 years old, and continued to do so even when she became a company vice president. She is married to Robert H. Phinny., The Gerber Products Company is the largest maker of baby food for infants in the United States.

Footnotes

Sources 

 Avakian, Arlene Voski et al., From Betty Crocker to Feminist Food Studies, Liverpool University Press (2005), 
 Belasco, Warren James et al., Food Nations, Routledge (2002), 
 Ingham, John N., Biographical Dictionary of American Business Leaders: A-G, Greenwood Publishing Group (1983), 

1927 births
Living people
20th-century American businesspeople
20th-century American businesswomen
21st-century American women